Located on 150 acres on Cedar Lake in Chester, Connecticut, Camp Hazen YMCA  provides positive youth camping experiences for over 1500 boys and girls each year from throughout the state. Group camping includes over 6000 participants annually. Camp Hazen YMCA  serves youth from throughout Connecticut, New England and many states around the country.  Each summer, Camp Hazen YMCA is also home to campers and counselors from more than 25 different countries. Campers come from all socio-economic backgrounds, and range in age from 5 to 18. Over 800 campers were provided with financial assistance in 2009. These funds, over $205,000, were provided through the generosity of individuals, foundations, businesses and service clubs.

Volunteers are a vital part of the organization. Camp Hazen YMCA has a 27-member Board of Directors. In addition, there are seven standing committees including: Executive Committee; Marketing and Communications; Board Development; Resource Development; Program; Building and Facilities; and Alumni Development. Camp Hazen YMCA was recently listed as one of the best value camps in the northeast by the Boston Globe.

History
In May 1919 The State YMCA voted that “Steps should be taken at once to secure a suitable site and equipment for the character development of the boys in Connecticut in connection with the advantages and favorable aspects of camp life”

Having grown up in the next town Senator Edward W. Hazen knew of a property, then known as the Stodt Farm, which would be a perfect place for a camp. In March 1920 he purchased the original 29 acres on Cedar Pond.  The State YMCA honored him by naming the camp, Camp Hazen and in the summer of 1920, the first camping sessions were held. Pop Stanley was the first Camp Director. A building on the site, Stanley Lodge, was named after him. The first summer was a success with boys from 10 to 20 years of age from around the state attending.  The boys built their own tents, did calisthenics drills in pajamas, swam, attended chapel, played sports, had tents inspection and siesta

In 1940 'Pop' Stanley retired after 20 years of incredible service as the Camp Director and because of the uncertain times associated with the War and rebuilding, they didn't have another long-term Director until Archie Knowles in 1948.  During World War II finding counselors was a tough assignment because so many of them had been drafted to fight.  For some campers, it was not unusual to wake up and find their counselor packing their belongings and heading off to 'boot camp'.  Quite often the only replacements for the staff were the older campers and sometimes this was thirteen-year-old boys.
After the war ended in 1945, camp flourished under Archie Knowles' leadership. The introduction of a leadership program, which was based in Oskalee Village, as well as a permanent teen trip program were some of the most significant program changes of this era.  In the seven years that Archie was the Camp Director he managed to restore many of the facilities, expand the program and stabilize their finances.  He is honored today by Knowles Lodge.

Howard Bunting was appointed director in 1955 and, along with his wife, began the longest era of directorship in Camp Hazen history.  Mr. and Mrs. 'B' were camp administrators for 22 years and were witness to major events such as the naming of Junianta, Mosakwa, Sachem and Tamarack Villages, the first night of the summer of 1967 when the Dining Hall burned to the ground, the replacement of the old cabins to the ones seen today and the Independence of Camp Hazen YMCA from the State YMCA of Connecticut

When Mr. 'B' retired in 1977 he was honored by having the Bunting Dining Hall named after him.  His successor, Russ Gormley was instrumental in developing the horseback program, the ropes course program, the naming of Tamarack Village and the biggest change in Camp Hazen YMCA history, going co-ed.  The first female Executive Director, Sue Edmonds, was appointed in 1988 followed by Tim Millbern in 1995 who started the popular day camp program.  Since 1999 Denise Learned has led Camp Hazen YMCA with the same focus as all of her predecessors, to 'help youth develop valuable life skills through camping experiences that build healthy bodies, open minds, and awakened spirits.' During this time the co-ed Village Onandaga was formed, allowing 10th grade campers to keep coming back to camp.  All of the cabins have been updated and a Post & Beam Maintenance Barn was added.

Resident Camp 
Hazen offers a traditional overnight camp for kids who entering grades 3 through 10. The resident campers are split into five villages by both gender and age.  A typical day of camp includes breakfast, cabin cleanup, activity periods one, two, and three, lunch, siesta, activity periods four and five, free time called Beach Party, dinner, an evening activity and cabin chat. At the beginning of each session, the campers get to preference their activities the allowing each child to tailor their experience to their liking. Activities include but are not limited to Rock Climbing, Ropes Course, Hiking, Drama, Radio, Archery, Tennis, Basketball, Soccer, Softball, General Water Sports, Instructional Swimming, Recreational Swimming, Arts and Crafts, Mountain Biking  The staff to camper ratio is 1:4. Overnight camp is offered in one or two week sessions.

Day Camp
Campers participate in: Creative Arts - crazy critters, clay models, dream catchers, face painting, nature art and more Land Sports - Basketball, kickball, volleyball, archery, capture the flag & parachute games Outdoor Pursuits - fishing, outdoor cooking, shelter building, climbing the wall Water Sports - Swimming lessons, canoeing (for all), kayaking (for older campers)

They carefully select their staff from colleges and universities around the United States, as well as from around the world.  Their staff is enthusiastic, well-trained, mature and intelligent.  They are excellent role models for children, chosen for their ability to create a warm, caring and diverse community for kids.  Overall, their Day Camp maintains a 1:6 staff to camper ratio. 
With over 150 acres of woodlands, lakes, streams and fields, Hazen offers one of the greatest locations for a summer camp. Their commitment to children ensures that safety always comes first. Swim lessons is provided on a daily basis for all Day Campers.  Due to the many activities that involve the lake swim lessons are mandatory.

LEA (Counselor-in-Training Program)
Camp Hazen’s LEA Program is a three-week course full of leadership workshops, team-building, lifeguard and belay training, working together as a group, planning activities, participating in daily program areas and a whole lot more.
Being a LEA means that you are willing to commit yourself to learning and to working hard in order to give yourself the opportunity to grow and develop as an individual. They learn to step outside of their comfort zone and to challenge themselves. Sample workshops include: Conflict Resolution & Problem Solving, Bully Prevention, Values Discovery, Communication Skills, Leadership Styles, Strife Guarding, Public Speaking, Developmental Assets, Camp Hazen YMCA Belay School, Child Abuse & Prevention, Customer Service, YMCA World Service.

References

External links 
 

Chester, Connecticut
Hazen
Hazen
Buildings and structures in Middlesex County, Connecticut